The 2010–11 Stanford Cardinal women's basketball team represented Stanford University in the 2010–11 NCAA Division I women's basketball season. The Cardinal, coached by Tara VanDerveer, and a member of the Pacific-10 Conference, won the conference's regular-season and tournament titles and advanced to the Final Four of the 2011 NCAA Division I women's basketball tournament.

Schedule

|-
!colspan=7| Pre-Season Schedule

|-
!colspan=7| Non-conference regular season Schedule

|-
!colspan=7| Pacific-10 Conference regular season Schedule

Postseason

Pac-10 Basketball Tournament

|-
!colspan=7| Pacific-10 Conference tournament
|-

NCAA basketball tournament

|-
!colspan=7| NCAA tournament

Team players drafted into the WNBA

See also
2010–11 NCAA Division I women's basketball season

External links
Official site

Stanford Cardinal women's basketball seasons
Stanford
NCAA Division I women's basketball tournament Final Four seasons
Stanford